Irma Margarita "Maga" Nevares Padilla (born December 7, 1948) is the wife of former Governor of Puerto Rico Pedro Rosselló and also the mother of former  Governor of Puerto Rico, Ricardo Rosselló. She served as First Lady from 1993 to 2001.

Early life
Nevares is the daughter of Oscar Nevares del Valle and Irma Padilla. The Nevares direct line goes back to Asturias, Spain.

Rosselló married Pedro Rosselló on August 9, 1969. They had three children: Juan Oscar (b. 1971), Luis Roberto (b. 1973), and Ricardo (b. 1979). Nevares de Rossello is also the aunt in law of former Menudo member and international singer Roy Rossello.

Later life
Nevares and her husband live in Dorado, near Dorado Beach.  On July 23, 2019 police in Puerto Rico had to provide extra security to their residence and neighborhood due to protesters calling for their son to resign as governor of Puerto Rico.

See also
Telegramgate

References

Living people
1948 births
First Ladies and Gentlemen of Puerto Rico
Puerto Rican people of Asturian descent
American people of Asturian descent
Rosselló family